Frederick Charles Bemment (12 October 1884 – 1957) was an English footballer who played in the Football League for Chesterfield Town and Notts County.

References

1884 births
1957 deaths
English footballers
Association football midfielders
English Football League players
Norwich City F.C. players
Notts County F.C. players
Chesterfield F.C. players